The Last Trail is a 1933 American pre-Code Western film directed by James Tinling and written by Stuart Anthony. The film stars George O'Brien, Claire Trevor, El Brendel, Matt McHugh, J. Carrol Naish, and George Reed. The film was released on August 25, 1933, by Fox Film Corporation. The picture was a remake of a 1921 film of the same name starring Wallace Beery.

Plot

Cast        
George O'Brien as Tom Daley
Claire Trevor as Patricia Carter
El Brendel as Newt Olsen
Matt McHugh as Looney McGann
J. Carrol Naish as John Ross
George Reed as Japonica Jones
Lucille La Verne as Mrs. Wilson
Ruth Warren as Sally Scott Olsen
Luis Alberni as Pedro Gonzales
Edward LeSaint as Judge Wilson

References

External links 

1933 films
Fox Film films
American Western (genre) films
1933 Western (genre) films
Films directed by James Tinling
American black-and-white films
Films produced by Sol M. Wurtzel
1930s English-language films
1930s American films